Joël-François Durand (born 17 September 1954) is a French composer.

Biography
Born in Orléans, Durand studied mathematics, music education and piano in Paris, then composition with Brian Ferneyhough in Freiburg im Breisgau, Germany (1981–84), and at Stony Brook University, New York, with Arel and Semegen (1984–86) . Between 1979 and 1984 he attended masterclasses by György Ligeti and Luciano Berio at the Centre Acanthes in Aix-en-Provence, and with Luigi Nono at the Freiburg Musikhochschule. In 1981–82 he was awarded a scholarship from the DAAD (German Academic Exchange Service) . In 1982 he received a Darmstadt Institute Scholarship for his String Trio, and in 1983 his piano piece ...d'asiles déchirés... was awarded a prize at the Third International K.H. Stockhausen Composition Competition in Brescia, Italy. He left Europe in 1984 to pursue a PhD in Composition (awarded in 1988) at Stony Brook University (USA), where he studied composition with Bülent Arel and electronic music with Daria Semegen.

Durand was awarded scholarships from the Fulbright Foundation (1984) and from the French Ministry of Culture (1985). He received the Kranichsteiner Musikpreis from the Darmstadt Internationalen Ferienkurse in 1990. He was appointed assistant professor in composition at the University of Washington in 1991, and was invited to teach at the University of California, San Diego in the autumn of 1992 . During the 1980-90s, he was regularly invited as a lecturer at the summer courses at Darmstädter Ferienkurse. He taught at the annual mastercourse at the Fondation Royaumont in France in 1993. He is currently Professor of Composition , and since 2002 Associate Director of the University of Washington School of Music .

In parallel to his activity as composer, Durand designs and manufactures high-end tonearms for record players. He founded the company Durand Tonearms LLC in 2009.

Works
Orchestral works
 Piano Concerto (1993) – 22'
 Five Musical Tales (1998) – 14'
 Athanor (2000–2001) – 20'
 Le Tombeau de Rameau III (2014) – 16'
Tropes de : Bussy (2017–18) – 25'

Chamber music and works for ensemble
 String Trio (1981) – 7'
 So er (1985) for 20 instruments – 11'
 Lichtung (1987) for 10 instruments – 12'
 Die innere Grenze (1988) for string sextet – 25'
 Un feu distinct (1991) for flute, clarinet, piano, violin and cello – 15'
 B.F., ein Mittelpunkt (1992) for 8 instruments – 3'
 La terre et le feu (1999) for oboe and ensemble – 18'
 La mesure des choses III. La mesure de la terre et du feu (1999) for oboe and viola – 12'
 Cinq Duos (1999) for violin and viola – 14'
 In the mirror land (2003) for flute and oboe; also versions for flute and B clarinet and for B clarinet and oboe – 6'
 Ombre/Miroir (2004) for flute and 14 instruments – 14'
 String Quartet (2005) – 21'
 Le Tombeau de Rameau (2008) for flute, viola, and harp – 23'
 Hermetic Definition (2012–13) for 10 instruments – 25'
 Cage 100 Party Piece (2013) for ensemble – 1'
 Mundus Imaginalis (2015) for 14 instruments – 17'
 Geister, schwebende Geister (2019–20) for solo viola and 9 instruments – 20'
 String quartet no.2, Cantar de Amigo (2020) – 27'

Works for solo instruments
 Roman (1982) for violin – 8'
 ...d'asiles déchirés... (1983) for piano – 12'
 La mesure des choses I. La mesure de l'air (1992) for B clarinet – 12'
 La mesure des choses II. La mesure de la mer (1993) for piano – 9'
 Le chemin (1994) for piano – 18'
 Un chant lointain (1995) for electronic carillon – 4'
 Les raisons des forces mouvantes (1996) for organ – 16'
 Par le feu receuilli (1997) for flute – 10'
 Au-delà, Cinq Etudes pour Piccolo (1997–98) for piccolo – 7'
 Tiodhlac (2001) for B clarinet – 3'
 Tiodhlac II (2006) for bass clarinet – 4'
 Further reflections on the nature of the mirror (2006) for flute – 8'
 Le Tombeau de Rameau II (2013) for piano – 25'
 Enfance (2015) for piano – 14'
 Yellow and Red (2015) for drum set – 12'
 La mesure des choses IV. La mesure du temps (2017) for one percussionist – 13'
 Geister, wieder... (2020) for solo viola – 15'
 In a weightless quiet (2020) for solo violin – 12'

Vocal music
 Trois Mélodies (1986) for mezzo-soprano and 5 instruments – 6'
 She or not (1998) for barytone – 9'

His music is published by DURAND Editions Musicales, Paris, and Editions Musicales Européennes, Paris, and distributed by Alexander Street Press, and BabelScores (Paris)

Discography
 La mesure des choses I. La mesure de l'air and Tiodhlac
Mathew Nelson, clarinet
Soundset Recordings SR1087, 2017

 Roman for solo violin
Eric Rynes, violin
Albany Troy1614, 2016

 Ombre/Miroir for flute and ensemble
musikFabrik, Helen Bledsoe (flute), James Wood (conductor)
Wergo 68542, Edition musikFabrik CD 04, 2010

 La terre et le feu – Les raisons des forces mouvantes – La mesure des choses III. La mesure de la terre et du feu – Athanor
BBC Symphony Orchestra – London Sinfonietta – Gareth Hulse (oboe) – Paul Silverthorne (viola) – Hans-Ola Ericsson (organ)
Mode 139, 2004

 Concerto for piano and orchestra – String Trio – Die innere Grenze
Deutsches Symphonie-Orchester Berlin, Stefan Litwin (piano), Bradley Lubman (conductor) – Trio de l'Ensemble Intercontemporain – Sextuor Schoenberg
Naive Montaigne Mo 782093, 1998

Bibliography

External links
Durand Homepage
Durand at the IRCAM Mediathèque
Joel Durand's page at BabelScores
Durand at the Classical Composers Database
Durand Tonearms Homepage
 Joël-François Durand's biography on Cdmc website
'Ep. 58: Joël-François Durand, composer' Interview by Tigran Arakelyan, 2017

1954 births
20th-century classical composers
21st-century classical composers
French classical composers
French male classical composers
Living people
Musicians from Orléans
University of Washington faculty
20th-century French composers
21st-century French composers